Suzy Spencer is an American author and journalist who made the New York Times Best Seller list in 1998 with her first true crime book Wasted.

Since then, she has written three additional true-crime books. Her book about alternative sex, Secret Sex Lives: A Year on the Fringes of American Sexuality was released in 2012.

Early life and education 
Spencer was born in Lufkin, Texas, where she graduated from Lufkin High School in 1972. She received a degree in journalism from Baylor University in Waco, Texas.

Career 
She moved to New York City and worked as a reporter/researcher for Fortune magazine. Two years later, Spencer was in Los Angeles freelance writing and completing an MBA in finance and marketing and a master's in professional writing from the University of Southern California.

Spencer has appeared on Good Morning America, ABC World News, Primetime, Dateline NBC, Fox News, CNN, MSNBC, Court TV, Oxygen, E! Channel, and Katie on ABC.

Books 
Her book Wasted about the 1995 murder of Regina Hartwelll in Austin, Texas, made the New York Times Best Seller List in 1998.

In February 2002, St. Martin's Press released Spencer's book, Breaking Point, about the Andrea Yates murders of her five children. After the book's release, Spencer's press credentials to cover the Yates trial was revoked by the court and she sued. The court denied her request, so she stood in line each day with the general public for a daily spectator pass.

Spencer's memoir, Secret Sex Lives, released by Berkley Books in 2012, was featured at that year's Texas Book Festival.

Her book The Fortune Hunter was the basis of the 2021 Lifetime movie Secrets of a Gold Digger Killer starring Julie Benz.

Reception 
Spencer was called by ABC's PRIMETIME LIVE program Austin, Texas' best-known true crime writer.  Her first four books each earned iawards:
Wasted was a New York Times bestseller and Violet Crown Book Award finalist;
Wages of Sin was reissued by Kensington Books in December 2010, 10th anniversary of the book's publication;
Breaking Point was a Book of the Month Club, Doubleday Book Club, Literary Guild and Mystery Guild selection;
The Fortune Hunter was called "riveting" and "blockbuster" by the Globe

References

External links 
 Author's website

1954 births
Living people
People from Lufkin, Texas
American non-fiction crime writers
21st-century American women writers
American women journalists
Baylor University alumni
Marshall School of Business alumni
University of Southern California alumni
21st-century American non-fiction writers
Women crime writers